

Cavalier County Historical Society
Established after 1969 - The Holy Trinity Church at Dresden, Cavalier County, North Dakota, became the cornerstone of the Cavalier County Museum. It now houses local historic artifacts and landmarks.

The Holy Trinity Church at Dresden replaced two previous wooden structures that both burned. The present structure was erected in 1936, built out of fieldstone collected by the local parishioners. An architect from Minneapolis, Fabian Redmond, designed the building. A stonemason from Rugby ND, Edroy Patterson, directed volunteer workers.

Assisting in the building of the church were Andrew Bachman-head carpenter, Alphonse Hiltner, Stanley Koehmstedt and William Geisen.

External links
 Museum Website
 Additional Information
 Cavalier County North Dakota

Museums in Cavalier County, North Dakota
History museums in North Dakota